John Meredith Temple (9 June 1910 – 10 December 1994) was a British Conservative Party politician.

Temple was elected to the House of Commons in a by-election in 1956 as Member of Parliament for the City of Chester, and held the seat until his retirement at the February 1974 general election.

References

Times Guide to the House of Commons

External links 
 

1910 births
1994 deaths
Conservative Party (UK) MPs for English constituencies
UK MPs 1955–1959
UK MPs 1959–1964
UK MPs 1964–1966
UK MPs 1966–1970
UK MPs 1970–1974